Title  18 of the United States Code is the main criminal code of the federal government of the United States.  The Title deals with federal crimes and criminal procedure. In its coverage, Title 18 is similar to most U.S. state criminal codes, which typically are referred to by such names as Penal Code, Criminal Code, or Crimes Code. Typical of state criminal codes is the California Penal Code. Many U.S. state criminal codes, unlike the federal Title 18, are based on the Model Penal Code promulgated by the American Law Institute.

Part I—Crimes

Chapters 1–10

: General Provisions 
  is repealed.
  defines principals.
  defines and provides punishment for "accessory after the fact".
  defines and provides punishment for "misprision of felony".
  defines "United States".
  defines "department" and "agency".
  defines "special maritime and territorial jurisdiction of the United States".
  defines "obligation or other security of the United States".
  defines "vessel of the United States".
  defines "interstate commerce" and "foreign commerce".
  defines "foreign government".
  defines "United States Postal Service".
  deals with laws of states adopted for areas within federal jurisdiction.
  is repealed.
  defines "obligation or other security of foreign government".
  defines "crime of violence".
  deals with the insanity defense, defining it as "an affirmative defense to a prosecution under any Federal statute that, at the time of the commission of the acts constituting the offense, the defendant, as a result of a severe mental disease or defect, was unable to appreciate the nature and quality or the wrongfulness of his acts", that "mental disease or defect does not otherwise constitute a defense", and that "the defendant has the burden of proving the defense of insanity by clear and convincing evidence".
  defines "organization".
  defines "petty offense".
  defines "financial institution".
  defines "stolen or counterfeit nature of property for certain crimes".
 .1 defines "court of the United States".
  provides "definitions relating to Federal health care offense".
  deals with the "use of minors in crimes of violence".

: Aircraft and Motor Vehicles 

  contains definitions.
  creates the "crime of destruction of aircraft or aircraft facilities".
  prohibits "destruction of motor vehicles or motor vehicle facilities".
  provides the "penalty when death results".
  prohibits "imparting or conveying false information".
  deals with drive-by shooting.
  prohibits "violence at international airports".
  deals with "fraud involving aircraft or space vehicle parts in interstate or foreign commerce".
 .1 prohibits unauthorized traffic signal preemption transmitters, while an additional .1 requires commercial vehicles to stop for inspections.

: Animals, Birds, Fish, and Plants 

  prohibits hunting, fishing, trapping, or disturbance or injury to birds, fish, or wildlife in any protected areas of the United States, and provides a penalty of a fine under this title or imprisonment up to six months, or both.
  is titled "importation or shipment of injurious mammals, birds, fish (including mollusks and crustacea), amphibia, and reptiles; permits, specimens for museums; regulations". It prohibits the import of harmful or invasive species, including Urva auropunctata, bats of the genus Pteropus, the zebra mussel, and the brown tree snake, and authorizes the Secretary of the Interior to bar other harmful species. The section also provides exemptions.
  is titled "animal enterprise terrorism" and prohibits intentional disruption or harm to "animal enterprises" through interstate or foreign commerce, and provides various penalties.
  bars the transportation of the invasive plants alligator weed, water caltrop, and Eichhornia crassipes, and provides for a penalty of a fine under this title, or imprisonment up to six months, or both.
  prohibits the use of an aircraft or motor vehicle to hunt any "wild unbranded horse, mare, colt, or burro running at large on any of the public land or ranges" and prohibits the pollution of any watering hole on any of the public land or ranges for the purpose of hunting any of the named animals, and provides for a penalty of a fine under this title, or imprisonment up to six months, or both, for each offense.
  prohibits the possession of any depiction of animal cruelty with the intention of placing that depiction in interstate or foreign commerce for commercial gain, and provides a penalty of a fine under this title, or imprisonment up to five years, or both, and excepts any depiction that has "serious religious, political, scientific, educational, journalistic, historical, or artistic value".

: Arson 

This chapter deals with arson. It has only one section.
 , which defines "arson", "attempted arson", or "conspiracy to commit arson", and provides a penalty of imprisonment for up to 25 years, the greater of the fine under this title or the cost of repairing or replacing any property that is damaged or destroyed, or both. It also provides that if the building is a dwelling or if the life of any person is placed in jeopardy, the penalty shall be a fine under this title, imprisonment for "any term of years or for life", or both.

: Assault 

This chapter deals with assault.
  prohibits "assaulting, resisting, or impeding" officers, employees and Law Enforcement Explorers of the United States while engaged in or on account of the performance of official duties, and the assault or intimidation of "any person who formerly served" as an officers or employees of the United States "on account of the performance of official duties during such person's term of service". The section provides for a penalty for simple assault of a fine, imprisonment for up to one year, or both, and a penalty in all other cases of a fine, imprisonment for up to eight years, or both. An enhanced penalty of a fine or imprisonment for up to 20 years is provided for if a "deadly or dangerous weapon" is used or if bodily injury is inflicted.
  is "protection of foreign officials, official guests, and internationally protected persons". It prohibits assaulting or causing harm to a "foreign official, official guest, or internationally protected person" or "any other violent attack upon the person or liberty of such person", and provides a penalty of a fine, imprisonment of up to three years, or both, and an enhanced penalty of a fine or imprisonment of up to 10 years, or both, if a deadly or dangerous weapon" is used or if bodily injury is inflicted.
  also prohibits "[i]ntimidating, coercing, threatening, or harassing a foreign official or an official guest, or obstructing a foreign official in the performance of his duties", or an attempt to do so, and additionally prohibits two or more people congregating within 100 feet of any building being used "for diplomatic, consular, or residential purposes" by foreign officials or international organization, "with intent to violate any other provision of this section", and provides for a fine, imprisonment up to six months, or both. The section also provides that "Nothing contained in this section shall be construed or applied so as to abridge the exercise of rights" guaranteed under the First Amendment to the United States Constitution.
  provides punishments for assault within the special maritime and territorial jurisdiction of the United States: for assault with intent to commit murder, imprisonment for not more than 20 years; for assault with intent to commit any felony except murder or a felony under chapter 109A, by a fine under this title or imprisonment for not more than ten years, or both; for assault with a dangerous weapon, with intent to do bodily harm, and without just cause or excuse, by a fine under this title or imprisonment for not more than ten years, or both; for assault by striking, beating, or wounding, by a fine under this title or imprisonment for not more than six months, or both; simple assault, by a fine under this title or imprisonment for not more than six months, or both, or if the victim of the assault is an individual who has not attained the age of 16 years, by fine under this title or imprisonment for not more than 1 year, or both; assault resulting in serious bodily injury, by a fine under this title or imprisonment for not more than ten years, or both; assault resulting in substantial bodily injury to an individual who has not attained the age of 16 years, by fine under this title or imprisonment for not more than 5 years, or both.
  also defines "substantial bodily injury" as bodily injury which involves a temporary but substantial disfigurement, or a temporary but substantial loss or impairment of the function of any bodily member, organ, or mental faculty, and defines "serious bodily injury" as the meaning given that term in section 1365 of this title.
 , makes it a crime within the special maritime and territorial jurisdiction of the United States to, with intent to torture (as defined in section 2340), and provides that whoever shall "maim, disfigure, cuts, bites, or slits the nose, ear, or lip, or cuts out or disables the tongue, or puts out or destroys an eye, or cuts off or disables a limb or any member of another person; or whoever, within the special maritime and territorial jurisdiction of the United States, and with like intent, throws or pours upon another person, any scalding water, corrosive acid, or caustic substance shall be fined under this title or imprisoned not more than 20 years, or both."
 : Influencing, impeding, or retaliating against a federal official by threatening or injuring a family member
 : Female genital mutilation to minors
 : Domestic assault by an habitual offender
 Assault on a federal process server is treated under Chapter 73 of Title 18, Section 1501.

: Bankruptcy

: Biological weapons

Chapters 11–123 

: Bribery, graft, and conflicts of interest
: Child support
: Chemical weapons
: Civil disorders
: Civil rights
Chapter 14 was repealed in 2002. It related to the former (Panama) Canal Zone.
: Claims and services in matters affecting government
Sections 285-292 apply
Sections 281-284 and 293 have been repealed
: Coins and currency
: Common carrier under the influence of alcohol or drugs
: Congressional, Cabinet, and Supreme Court assassination, kidnapping, and assault
: Conspiracy
 defines conspiracy against the United States.
: Contempts
: Contracts
: Counterfeiting and forgery
: Criminal street gangs
: Customs
: Elections and political activities
: Embezzlement and theft
: Emblems, insignia, and names
 deals with flag desecration.
 prohibits the unauthorized manufacture, sale, or possession of official badges, identification cards or other insignia.
 prohibits the unauthorized wear of the uniforms of the armed forces and Public Health Service, or of imitations.
 likewise prohibits the unauthorized wear of uniforms of foreign friendly nations with "intent to deceive or mislead".
 prohibits the unauthorized wear, manufacture, or sale of awards and decorations of the United States military, with special provisions increasing the penalty if the award is the Medal of Honor,
: Escape and rescue
: Espionage and censorship
: Explosives and other dangerous articles
: Importation, manufacture, distribution and storage of explosive materials
: Extortion and threats (including threats against the President of the United States)
: Extortionate credit transactions
: False personation
: Firearms
 defines various terms as used in §§ 921–931, which are also found in the definition of aggravated felony. 
 prohibiting certain behavior involving firearms (e.g. 18 U.S. Code § 922(g), declaring it unlawful for a prohibited person to ship, transport, or possess a firearm)

: Foreign relations threats
: Forfeiture (§§ 981–987)
: Fraud and false statements (§§ 1001–1040)
: addresses computer fraud, defining a protected computer via the Computer Fraud and Abuse Act.
: Fugitives from justice
: Homicide
: Indians
: Kidnapping
: Labor
: Liquor traffic
: Lotteries
: Mail fraud
 targets frauds and swindles.
 applies to fictitious name or address.
 applies to fraud by wire, radio, or television.
 applies to bank fraud.
 provides for injunctions against fraud.
 is a single sentence: "For the purposes of this chapter, the term 'scheme or artifice to defraud' includes a scheme or artifice to deprive another of the intangible right of honest services."
 targets health care fraud.
 targets securities fraud.
 is a single sentence: "Any person who attempts or conspires to commit any offense under this chapter shall be subject to the same penalties as those prescribed for the offense, the commission of which was the object of the attempt or conspiracy."
 was introduced by the Sarbanes-Oxley Act and applies to failure of corporate officers to certify financial reports.
: Malicious mischief
: Military and navy
: [Repealed]
: Nationality and citizenship
: Obscenity
: Obstruction of justice
: Partial-birth abortions
: Passports and visas
: Peonage, slavery, and trafficking in persons
: Perjury
: Piracy and privateering
: Postal Service
: Presidential and Presidential staff assassination, kidnapping, and assault
: Prison-made goods
: Prisons
: Privacy
: Professions and occupations
: Protection of trade secrets
: Protection of unborn children
: Public lands
: Public officers and employees
: Racketeering
: Racketeer influenced and corrupt organizations
: Railroads
: [Repealed]
: Records and reports
: Riots
: Robbery and burglary
: Sabotage
: Seamen and stowaways
: Searches and seizures
: Sexual abuse
: Sexual exploitation and other abuse of children
: Domestic violence and stalking
: Seamen shipping
: Stolen property
: Telemarketing fraud
: Terrorism
: Torture
: Trafficking in contraband cigarettes
: Treason, sedition, and subversive activities
: Transportation for illegal sexual activity and related crimes
: War crimes
: Wire and electronic communications interception and interception of oral communications
: Stored wire and electronic communications and transactional records access
: Prohibition on release and use of certain personal information from state motor vehicle records

Part II—Criminal Procedure
: General Provisions
: Arrest and Commitment
: Rewards for Information Concerning Terrorist Acts and Espionage
: Searches and Seizures
: Pen Registers and Trap and Trace Devices
: Release and Detention Pending Judicial Proceedings
: Speedy Trial
: Extradition
: Jurisdiction and Venue
: Military Extraterritorial Jurisdiction
: Extraterritorial Jurisdiction over Certain Trafficking In Persons Offenses
: Limitations
: Grand Jury
: Special Grand Jury
: Indictment and Information
: Trial by United States Magistrate Judges
: Arraignment, Pleas and Trial
: Witnesses and Evidence
: Protection of Witnesses
: Verdict
: Sentences
: Death Sentence
: Post-Conviction DNA Testing
: Postsentence Administration
: [Repealed]
: Miscellaneous Sentencing Provisions
: Special Forfeiture of Collateral Profits of Crime
: Contempts
: Crime Victims Rights

Part III—Prisons and Prisoners
: General Provisions
: Bureau of Prisons
: Commitment and Transfer
: Transfer To or From Foreign Countries
: Employment
: [Repealed]
: [Repealed]
: Offenders with Mental Disease or Defect
: [Repealed]
: Discharge and Release Payments
: Institutions for Women
: National Institute of Corrections

Part IV—Correction of Youthful Offenders
: General provisions
: [Repealed]
: Juvenile delinquency

Part V—Immunity of Witnesses
: Immunity of Witnesses

This statute covers a specific way to satisfy the Fifth Amendment (right to silence as a form of protection against self-incrimination) to the Constitution, but still force witnesses to testify.  Basically, if a witness—whether in a federal court such as a United States District Court or in testimony before a Congressional subcommittee—refuses to answer questions and pleads the 5th, the presiding officer can use the provisions of Title 18 Chapter 601 to forcibly compel the witness to answer the questions.  Since this would violate the 5th amendment rights of the witness, the statute requires that the presiding officer must mandatorily preserve those rights, by guaranteeing the witness immunity from prosecution for anything they might truthfully say under such compulsion.  (The witness is being compelled to answer the questions truthfully—if they lie, they can be tried in court for perjury, but as long as they tell the truth, they are immune from being personally prosecuted for anything they might say—which is the reverse of the usual situation, where anything you say can and will be used against you in a court of law.)

Actually giving a particular witness guaranteed immunity as a means to compelling their testimony is somewhat involved; the details of how it is done vary depending on the particular branch of government hearing the testimony.  If the witness is testifying before an agency (includes Army/Navy/AirForce/VA/DOD/HomeSec/StateDept, FCC/FTC, DOT/NTSB, DOE/NRC/COP/DeptOfTheInterior, SEC/CFTC/FedBoard/FDIC, NLRB/LaborDept/CommerceDept/AgDept, DOJ/Treasury, and many others), the presiding officer for the agency needs approval from the federal Attorney General before they can grant a witness immunity and compel testimony.  In court cases, the federal district attorney (for the particular federal district court which has jurisdiction in the case) needs approval from either the federal attorney general directly or from a specific set of the federal attorney general's underlings.  In the case of testimony before congress, the body hearing the testimony must vote on whether or not to give immunity as a means to compel testimony, before getting a federal district court to issue to compulsion order; for a subcommittee, two-thirds of the full membership must vote affirmative, whereas for testimony before an entire house of congress a simple majority of members present voting affirmative is acceptable.  Although congress must notify the federal attorney general 10 days in advance of submitting their request for compulsion to the federal district court, the AG cannot veto the order (but they can at their option instruct the federal district court to delay issuing the compulsion order for a period up to 20 days total).

See also
 Criminal law of the United States
 Conspiracy against the United States

Notes

References

External links
 U.S. Code Title 18, via United States Government Printing Office
 U.S. Code Title 18, via Cornell University
 text of Title 18 Chapter 601 Immunity for witnesses, via findlaw.com
 http://witnesses.uslegal.com/immunity, on the reasoning behind immunity guarantees
 How to incriminate yourself on the stand without getting in trouble, Jan 2008, by Harlan Protass, on Slate.com; retrieved 2011-11-02.

 
United States
18
Code
Extraterritorial jurisdiction